Jacob Alexander Roper (born January 25, 1987) is an American Internet celebrity primarily known for hosting the Vsauce3 YouTube channel, which is part of the YouTube channel brand Vsauce.

Career 
Prior to working on YouTube, Roper used his film degree for various jobs in television and advertising. Before working with Michael Stevens under the Vsauce brand, Roper was working at Google, alongside Stevens, as well as hosting a YouTube show called Space Lab, which was a space show for kids. Roper began to host Vsauce3 in 2012.

Roper's channel focuses on explanations of the science behind fictional worlds, according to The Daily Dot in 2015. On March 31, 2017, Roper announced he had joined as the new director of production at Casey Neistat's company Beme. However, on January 31, 2018, CNN closed the Beme News division and offered the 22-person team positions in CNN.

On September 20, 2018, Roper announced he would host the YouTube Original special Could You Survive the Movies. On May 21, 2020, the show was nominated for a Daytime Emmy Award in the category "Outstanding Educational or Informational Series", which it won.

Personal life 
Roper was born on January 25, 1987 and grew up in Evergreen, Colorado. He attended New York's School of Visual Arts where he received a degree in film. On November 25, 2015, Roper announced on his side channel that he had a rare form of cancer called a sarcoma. In June 2016, he announced that test readings had come back indicating that the cancer was gone.

Filmography

Television

Awards and nominations

References

External links 
 
 Jake Roper's second channel on YouTube
 

1987 births
Living people
American YouTubers
Online edutainment
Vsauce3
School of Visual Arts alumni
People from Evergreen, Colorado
People from Los Angeles
Gaming YouTubers
YouTube channels launched in 2010